Lublin is a city in Poland.

Lublin may also refer to:

Communities
Lublin, Wisconsin, United States
Lublin, Moldova, a Jewish agricultural colony founded in what is now Nimereuca (Niemirówka) in 1842

Sports teams
Bystrzyca Lublin, a women's handball team
Start Lublin, a men's basketball team

People
Biernat of Lublin, 15th- and 16th-century Polish poet, fabulist and physician
Meir Lublin, Polish rabbi from the 16th and 17th century (also called "The Maharam")
Yaakov Yitzchak of Lublin, Chassidic rabbi from the 18th and 19th centuries.

Political divisions
Union of Lublin, the 1569 act that united Poland and Lithuania as the Polish–Lithuanian Commonwealth
Lublin Department, a 19th-century division of the Duchy of Warsaw
Lublin District, in the General Governorate, 1939–1944
Lublin Voivodeship, an administrative region of eastern modern Poland
Lublin (European Parliament constituency)

Vehicles
Lublin truck, a 1950s Polish truck, built in Lublin
Lublin van, made in Lublin by FSC Lublin Automotive Factory
Lublin, an aircraft produced by Plage i Laśkiewicz, the first Polish aircraft manufacturer, including:
Lublin R-VIII, a 1920s aircraft
Lublin R-XIII, a 1930s aircraft

Universities
John Paul II Catholic University of Lublin
Medical University of Lublin
Maria Curie-Skłodowska University of Lublin

History
Polish Committee of National Liberation, often called the Lublin Committee
Lublin Reservation, a concentration camp set up for Jews near Lublin by the Nazis during the Second World War

Other uses
Lublin (Hasidic dynasty)